Bussmann and Quantick Kingsize was a short-lived radio programme that aired from April to May 1998.  There were five half-hour episodes and it was broadcast on BBC Radio 4.  It starred Jane Bussmann, David Quantick, Peter Serafinowicz, Emma Clarke, and Steve Brody.

References 
 Lavalie, John. Bussmann and Quantick Kingsize, EpGuides. 21 Jul 2005. 29 Jul 2005  <http://epguides.com/BussmanandQuantickKingsize/>.

BBC Radio comedy programmes
BBC Radio 4 programmes